Nova Scotia is one of Canada's provinces, and has established several provincial symbols.

Symbols

References

Nova Scotia
Symbols
Canadian provincial and territorial symbols